The Honda RS125R was a 125 cc two-stroke Grand Prix racing motorcycle manufactured by Honda Racing Corporation for racing purposes only.

It debuted in 1980, racing in the All Japan Road Race Championship.

In 1987 a redesigned version was entered in the World Championship ridden by Ezio Gianola; since 1988 the new bikes were manufactured also for customer teams.

The Honda RS125R has won nine World Championship titles for riders, with Loris Capirossi, Dirk Raudies, Haruchika Aoki, Emilio Alzamora, Dani Pedrosa, Andrea Dovizioso and Thomas Lüthi, while Honda was crowned Constructors' World Champion eleven times.

1995 Honda RS125R specifications

References

RS125R
Grand Prix motorcycles
Motorcycles introduced in 1987
Two-stroke motorcycles